Hendrick Mokganyetsi (born 7 September 1975 in Pretoria) is a South African sprinter who specializes in the 400 meters.

His personal best time is 44.59 seconds, achieved in September 2000 in Yokohama. He also has a strong personal best in the 800 meters, 1:44.62 minutes from 1997. Together with Jopie van Oudtshoorn, Adriaan Botha and Arnaud Malherbe he holds the South African record in 4 x 400 meters relay with 3:00.20 minutes, achieved at the 1999 World Championships in Seville where South Africa finished fourth (later third).  The South African relay team broke their own record of 3:00.26 min, achieved when they finished in fifth place at the 1997 World Championships.

On the individual level he finished sixth at the 2000 Summer Olympics in Sydney.

External links

1975 births
Living people
Sportspeople from Pretoria
South African male sprinters
South African male middle-distance runners
Athletes (track and field) at the 1996 Summer Olympics
Athletes (track and field) at the 2000 Summer Olympics
Athletes (track and field) at the 2004 Summer Olympics
Olympic athletes of South Africa
World Athletics Championships medalists
Commonwealth Games competitors for South Africa
Athletes (track and field) at the 1998 Commonwealth Games
20th-century South African people
21st-century South African people